5026 Martes is a carbonaceous asteroid from the inner region of the asteroid belt, approximately  in diameter. It was discovered on 22 August 1987, by Czech astronomer Antonín Mrkos at Kleť Observatory in the Czech Republic. It is named after the two weasel-like animal species: pine marten and beech marten.

Orbit and classification 

Martes is the namesake member of a small asteroid family, named the Martes family. It orbits the Sun in the inner main-belt at a distance of 1.8–3.0 AU once every 3 years and 8 months (1,339 days). Its orbit has an eccentricity of 0.24 and an inclination of 4° with respect to the ecliptic.

A first precovery was taken at Palomar Observatory in 1953, extending the body's observation arc by 34 years prior to its official discovery observation at Klet.

Naming 

This minor planet was named for the two species of the family Mustelidae, the pine marten and beech marten. They also live in the forests near the discovering Kleť Observatory. The official naming citation was published by the Minor Planet Center on 22 June 1999.

Physical characteristics 

Martes has been characterized as a carbonaceous C-type asteroid by PanSTARRS photometric survey.

Asteroid pair 

Lightcurves 

Between 2008 and 2010, several rotational lightcurves of Martes were obtained from photometric observations. Lightcurve analysis gave a well-defined rotation period of 4.4243 hours with a brightness amplitude of 0.69 magnitude.

Diameter and albedo 

According to the survey carried out by NASA's Wide-field Infrared Survey Explorer with its subsequent NEOWISE mission, Martes measures 8.967 kilometers in diameter and its surface has an albedo of 0.066, which is typical for carbonaceous asteroids. The Collaborative Asteroid Lightcurve Link, however, assumes a standard albedo for stony asteroids of 0.20 and consequently calculates a much smaller diameter of 4.93 kilometers, due to the higher albedo.

References

External links 
 (3428) Roberts, 3D Asteroid Catalogue
 Lightcurve Database Query (LCDB), at www.minorplanet.info
 Dictionary of Minor Planet Names, Google books
 Discovery Circumstances: Numbered Minor Planets (5001)-(10000) – Minor Planet Center
 
 

005026
005026
Discoveries by Antonín Mrkos
Named minor planets
19870822